The 1987 Cork Senior Football Championship was the 99th staging of the Cork Senior Football Championship since its establishment by the Cork County Board in 1887. The draw for the opening round fixtures took place on 21 December 1986. The championship began on 2 May 1987 and ended on 15 November 1987.

Imokilly entered the championship as the defending champions.

On 15 November 1987, Nemo Rangers won the championship following a 2-11 to 0-09 defeat of Imokilly in the final. This was their eighth championship title overall and their first title since 1983.

Ephie Fitzgerald from the Nemo Rangers club was the championship's top scorer with 1-15.

Team changes

To Championship

Promoted from the Cork Intermediate Football Championship
 Castletownbere

From Championship

Regraded to the Cork Intermediate Football Championship
 Bantry Blues
 Macroom

Results

First round

Second round

Quarter-finals

Semi-finals

Final

Championship statistics

Top scorers

Top scorers overall

Top scorers in a single game

Miscellaneous

 O'Donovan Rossa's 1-05 to 0-05 defeat of Bishopstown was their first ever victory at senior level.

References

Cork Senior Football Championship